Abdullah Othman can refer to:

 Abdullah Othman (Malaysian footballer) (born 1945), Malaysian footballer
 Abdullah Othman (Saudi footballer) (born 1990), Saudi footballer